Monte Bano is a mountain in Liguria, northern Italy, part of the Ligurian Apennines.  It is located in the province of Genoa. It lies at an altitude of 1035 metres.

References

Mountains of Liguria
One-thousanders of Italy
Mountains of the Apennines